CKRL-FM is a French-language Canadian radio station located in Quebec City, Quebec.

The station operates under a community radio licence and is owned by a non-profit group known as CKRL-MF 89,1 inc.  It broadcasts on 89.1 MHz with an effective radiated power of 1,495 watts (class A) using an omnidirectional antenna, broadcasting from Edifice Marie-Guyart in downtown Quebec City.

CKRL-FM began broadcasting on February 15, 1973 at 5 p.m. and was originally a campus radio station for the Université Laval; this situation ceased in 1984, although the name of the corporation remained "Campus Laval FM inc." for many years thereafter.  94.3 CHYZ-FM became the new campus radio station of that university in 1997.

The station is a member of the Association des radiodiffuseurs communautaires du Québec.

External links
 CKRL FM 89,1
 
 

Krl
Krl
Krl
Radio stations established in 1973
1973 establishments in Quebec